The 1983 U.S. Figure Skating Championships took place at Pittsburgh Civic Arena in Pittsburgh, Pennsylvania, with the female champion crowned February 3, 1983, and male champion crowned February 4, 1983. Medals were awarded in three colors: gold (first), silver (second), and bronze (third) in four disciplines – men's singles, ladies' singles, pair skating, and ice dancing – across three levels: senior, junior, and novice.

The event determined the U.S. team for the 1983 World Championships.

Senior results

Men

Ladies

Pairs

Ice dancing

Junior results

Men

Ladies

Pairs

Ice dancing

Novice results

Men

Ladies

Pairs

Ice dancing

References

External links
 The 1983 United States Figure Skating Championships Pittsburgh, Pennsylvania February 1-6, 1983
 Sports Illustrated report week following

U.S. Figure Skating Championships
United States Figure Skating Championships, 1983
United States Figure Skating Championships, 1983
U.S. Figure Skating Championships